The Midland Football League is an English football league that was founded in 2014 by the merger of the former Midland Alliance and Midland Combination. The league has four divisions that sit at levels 9–12 of the football pyramid.

History
The league was formed in 2014 following the merger of the Midland Alliance and Midland Combination. 

Successful Premier Division clubs can win promotion to the 8th level of the English football league system, while the competition also has a number of feeder leagues at level 11, which provide new member clubs each year. Entry can also be gained by applying from non-pyramid leagues such as the Birmingham & District Football League.

Clubs are also liable to be transferred to other leagues if the FA deems it geographically suitable to do so.

Current clubs (2022–23)

Premier Division

Division One

Division Two

Division Three

Honours

Champions

Promoted

League Cup

Finals
Source

Notes

References

External links
 Official site
 Midland League at FA Full-time

 
9
Sports leagues established in 2014
2014 establishments in England